Statistics of the USFSA Football Championship in the 1904 season.

Tournament

First round
Amiens AC - RC Roubaix

Quarts de finale  
United Sports Club 8-0 Sport Athlétique Sézannais
 RC Roubaix - Club Sportif Havrais (Havre forfeited)
Olympique de Marseille 2-2 Burdigala Bordeaux (match replayed)
Stade rennais 1-0 Association Sportive des Étudiants de Caen
Olympique de Marseille 2-0 Burdigalia Bordeaux

Semifinals  
 RC Roubaix 12-1 Stade rennais 
 United Sports Club 4-0 Olympique de Marseille

Final  
RC Roubaix 4-2 United Sports Club

References
RSSF

USFSA Football Championship
1
France